Nieva (meaning Snows), is a Spanish pop rock group formed in the 2000s by Noemí Carrión (singer), and Antonio Escobar (producer). whose musical sound fuses electric guitars with electronica.

Biography

Antonio Escobar and Noemí Carrión met during 2002, in the Madrid recording studio of Spanish House DJ and record producer Dr Kucho!, where they were recording vocals for Carrión's solo album for Sony Music. In 2004, they formed Nieva and in 2007, after 3 years of development, the duo performed concerts, in Spanish cities with a full band, before writing, recording and producing their debut album. In 2011, the group began the final mixing and mastering of Sed De Mar (Sea Of Thirst) which featured the songs De Cualquier Manera, Maldito Veneno, Rompecorazones and Sólo Me Importas Tú.

Discography

Nieva De Cualquier Manera, Maldito Veneno, Rompecorazones, Sólo Me Importas Tú (Antipop, España), EP
Nieva Sed De Mar (Antipop, España), album

See also
Spanish rock
Rock en Español

References

External links
Nieva on Myspace

Spanish pop rock music groups
Spanish musical duos
Spanish indie rock groups
Spanish alternative rock groups
Rock en Español music groups
Discographies of Spanish artists
Male–female musical duos